This is a list of video games featuring various Disney properties.

Classic animated shorts
Following lists are based around various characters from various Disney animated shorts.

Mickey Mouse games
Mickey Mouse is the figurehead of the Walt Disney Company. Nintendo has acquired many licenses to produce Mickey Mouse, from early Game & Watch titles to the latest home consoles. In these games players play as Mickey Mouse.

Donald Duck games
The following games are based around Donald Duck properties.

Goofy games
The following games are based around the character Goofy.

Rhythm games

Sports games

Winnie the Pooh games
The following games are based on Disney's Winnie the Pooh.

Disney animated feature films games
The following list consists of games based on Disney animated features.

The Nightmare Before Christmas games
Two games have been made that are sequels to The Nightmare Before Christmas.

Disney Television Animation games
Various games have been based on original Disney Television Animation series.

The Disney Afternoon
The following games are based around DuckTales, Darkwing Duck and other Disney Afternoon properties.

Other animated TV series
The following games are based around animated TV series produced by Disney Television Animation which were not part of The Disney Afternoon, or aired on Disney Channel.

Pixar games
The following games are from the Toy Story series and other feature films produced by Pixar.

Live-action games
Few of Disney live-action film series have been bases for video games.

Tron games
The following games are from the Tron series.

Dick Tracy games
The following games are based around the 1990 film of the same name.

Pirates of the Caribbean
The following games are from the Pirates of the Caribbean series:
 Pirates of the Caribbean (originally entitled Sea Dogs II) was released in 2003 by Bethesda Softworks to coincide with the release of Pirates of the Caribbean: The Curse of the Black Pearl. Although it had no relation to the characters, it features the movie's storyline about cursed Aztec gold and undead pirates, and it was the first of several games to be inspired by the attraction, prior to this exploring the stories that made Captain Jack Sparrow a legend.
 Pirates of the Caribbean Multiplayer Mobile for mobile phones.
 Pirates of the Caribbean Online, a massively multiplayer online role playing game which was released in 2007.
 Pirates of the Caribbean: The Curse of the Black Pearl for Game Boy Advance and a few others. This game is based on Captain Jack Sparrow's misadventures in the pursuit of saving Ria Anasagasti with his shipmate Will Turner.
 Pirates of the Caribbean: The Legend of Jack Sparrow was released for the PlayStation 2 console and for PC.
 Pirates of the Caribbean: Dead Man's Chest, was released for the Nintendo DS, PlayStation Portable, Game Boy Advance and others.
 Pirates of the Caribbean: At World's End, based on the film, was released in May 2007. It was the first game in the series to be released for a seventh generation console.
 Pirates of the Caribbean: Armada of the Damned, an action and role playing video game, was being developed by Propaganda Games but was cancelled in October 2010.
 Lego Pirates of the Caribbean: The Video Game, released in May 2011, is the most recent Pirates game. It features the first four films as well as over 70 characters and over 21 levels.
 Pirates of the Caribbean: Master of the Seas, a gaming app available on Android and iOS.

Miscellaneous Disney games
The following games are based on Disney's other cartoon and film licenses such as Who Framed Roger Rabbit, Kingdom Hearts or Disney Parks.

Roger Rabbit games
The following games are based around the character Roger Rabbit.

Other games
Games that do not fit in the above lists or the franchises they belong weren’t listed above.

Disney Parks games
Games based on Disney theme parks and resorts.

Kingdom Hearts games
The following games are from the Kingdom Hearts series by Square Enix which incorporates characters from various Disney properties, as well as the Final Fantasy and The World Ends with You series. They don't fit in with other Disney properties since Disney characters are mostly non-playable.

Spectrobes games
The following games are from the Spectrobes series. It was Disney's first major original video game IP that did not launch alongside a film or TV series.

References

External links
 Disney Games

 
Video games by genre
Disney